Nathan Wegman (born 4 June 1977) is an Australian former cricketer who played for Tasmania in 2007–08. He plays his club cricket for New Town Cricket Club. He is a tall fast bowler with a whipping action, who produces deceptive pace. In his debut List A match for the Tigers, Wegman bowled beautifully to take 4/44 off 8.5 overs, including the prized wicket of New South Wales captain Simon Katich.
 
Although a Launcestonian by birth, Nathan moved to Clarence to play in the more competitive TCA competition, a move which paid dividends when he was called up to the Tasmanian Tigers to help cover the bowling injury crisis of 2006.

1977 births
Living people
Australian cricket coaches
Australian cricketers
Cricketers from Launceston, Tasmania
Tasmania cricketers